Prigogine's sunbird or Prigogine's double-collared sunbird (Cinnyris prigoginei) is a species of bird in the family Nectariniidae.

Taxonomy

It is sometimes considered a subspecies of the greater double-collared sunbird (Cinnyris afer). Alternatively, it has been considered related to other members of the greater double-collared sunbird species complex, including Stuhlmann's sunbird (Cinnyris stuhlmanni) and montane double-collared sunbird (Cinnyris ludovicensis), but it is now regarded as a full species.

Distribution and habitat

It is endemic to the Marungu highlands of Tanganyika Province, southeastern Democratic Republic of the Congo. Its natural habitat is montane forest.

Conservation

It is threatened by habitat loss.

References

Prigogine's double-collared sunbird
Birds of Central Africa
Prigogine's double-collared sunbird